Mazraat es-Siyad (also transliterated Mazraet es-Siyed, Mazraet al-Siyed) is a mountainous village in the highlands of the Byblos District in the  Keserwan-Jbeil Governorate, Lebanon.

History
The area where the town stands was known as Deir ʿaouzeh, in reference to an ancient Chrisitan monastery.

During the Mamluk era (13th–15th century), local chieftain Sheikh Nawfal Ibrahim al-Khoury bestowed the ruins the monastery to an ancestor of al-Husseini family, Sayyid Hussein al-Husseini. Al-Husseini is said to be the first person to reside in the abandoned area after he had restored the monastery. During the Mutasarrifate (1861–1918), the town was administratively part of the Mnaitra mudiriyah, within the kaza of Kesserwan.

Geography
Mazraat es-Siyyad is located in the Byblos District in the Mount Lebanon Governorate. It is 58 kilometers north of the capital Beirut. The municipal area of Mazraat es-Siyad includes the hamlets of Abboud, Mazraat er-Rmeileh, Sharbineh and Bolhos.

Etymology 
Mazraat es-Siyad translates as "Grange of the Lords" from Arabic, in reference to Siyyad an attribute of the al-Husseini family. The Siyyad (Lords) are Shia Muslims recognized as descendants of the prophet Muhammad through his grandsons, Hasan and Husayn ibn Ali.

The hamlet of Abboud is named after Abboud Gharios Ouais, a forefather of the Gharios family, and Mazraat er-Rmeileh is so named after the nature of the terrain which is composed of sandstone.

Demographics

The population lives in a total of 220 houses in the town. There were 1,250 voters from Mazraat es-Siyad registered in 2005. The population is predominantly Maronite and Shia. The largest families in order of size according to the 2014 election records are Al-Husseini, Karkaba, Bou Gharios, Obeid, Bou Acar, Zaarour, Gharios, Barakat, Bou Salman, Abi Akar, Karam, Ziadé, Mdawar, and El-Khoury.

Government
Mazraat es-Siyad municipality was established in 2004. The municipal council currently has twelve members. In addition to the municipal council, Mazraat es-Siyad has a three-member mayoral council headed by a mukhtar (headman).

Economy
Agriculture, namely pomology is the main economic activity in the Byblos highlands. Mazraet es-Siyad has many natural water sources, fertile soil and arable land. Residents also depend on permanent jobs, as there are 15 small commercial and industrial companies, in addition to two hotels, the Shangri-La and the Monte Carlo.

Cultural landmarks
Mazraet es-Siyad has numerous ancient archaeological relics, such as the remains of old vernacular houses, rock cut wine presses, and historical religious buildings. The town's main sites are Mar Abda (Saint Abdas) Church, a Maronite church founded in 1708 by the Gharios family. Mar Abda was significantly expanded during later centuries. The Mazra’at As-Siyyad Mosque, a historical Shia muslim mosque built in line with a decision by Mutasarrıf Wasa Pasha (ruled 1883–1892). Saydet an-Najat (Our Lady of Salvation), the town's second Maronite Church. The two churches are located at the opposite sides of the glen that splits the town in two.

Culture

Festivities
Mazraat es-Siyad celebrates the Feast of the Lady of Salvation (Saydet an-Najat) on 8 September, and Saint Abdas on 31 August with traditional dinners and festivities.

Notable residents
 Ahmad al-Husseini, Lebanese parliament deputy elected in 1932.

References

Populated places in Byblos District
Maronite Christian communities in Lebanon
Shia Muslim communities in Lebanon